"Mitternacht" is the fourth and last single from German singer LaFee's self-titled album LaFee. It was released in Germany on 24 November 2006. An English version of the song, entitled "Midnight Strikes", later appeared on LaFee's third studio album Shut Up.

Music video
The music video premiered on 18 November 2006 on the German music show VIVA Live.

It was directed by Bastien Francois and was shot in Berlin, Germany. The video stays close to the song's theme of child abuse as it depicts LaFee as an angel who was sent to free a young girl, who is a victim of child abuse, from her abuser. It also features the members of LaFee's band who are depicted as clowns.

The video was nominated for "Best National Video" at the ECHO music awards in 2007.

Track listing
CD Maxi Single
 ""Mitternacht" (Video version) - 4:09
 "Alles ist neu" - 3:47
 "Du liebst mich nicht" - 4:41
 "Wo bist du (Mama)" (Live version) - 5:37

Enhanced CD Maxi Single
 "Mitternacht" (Album version) - 4:46
 "Mitternacht" (Piano version) - 3:54
 "Prinzesschen" (Live version) - 4:25
 "Virus" (Live video) - 4:36
 Backstage Material (Making of Secret Gig Kurzversion) - 3:59

Charts

References

2006 singles
LaFee songs
2006 songs
Songs written by Bob Arnz
EMI Records singles
Songs written by Gerd Zimmermann (songwriter)